Intendente Alvear is a town in La Pampa Province in Argentina.

References

External links

Populated places in La Pampa Province